Andreas Mayer (born 15 December 1980) is a German footballer and manager who plays for SV Neresheim.

Career

Coaching career
In June 2020, Mayer joined SV Neresheim as a player-assistant. A year later, in June 2021, he was appointed player-manager of the club.

References

External links

1980 births
Living people
German footballers
SSV Ulm 1846 players
Kickers Emden players
TSG 1899 Hoffenheim players
VfR Aalen players
KSV Hessen Kassel players
2. Bundesliga players
3. Liga players
Association football midfielders
FC Memmingen players
People from Nördlingen
Sportspeople from Swabia (Bavaria)
Footballers from Bavaria
German football managers